F-actin-capping protein subunit alpha-1 is a protein that in humans is encoded by the CAPZA1 gene.

CAPZA1 is a member of the F-actin capping protein alpha subunit family. This gene encodes the alpha subunit of the barbed-end actin binding protein.

Function 
The protein regulates growth of the actin filament by capping the barbed end (plus-end) of growing actin filaments, preventing any further assembly from occurring. This protein can be bound to the lipid PIP2 preventing it from binding to actin filaments.

References

Further reading